List of speakers of the Legislative Assembly of the Cayman Islands.

References

Politics of the Cayman Islands
Cayman Islands